Admiral John Luce,  (4 February 1870 – 22 September 1932) was a senior officer in the Royal Navy during and after the First World War. He played a significant role in the early development of British naval aviation and held command during the Battle of Coronel and the Battle of the Falkland Islands in the South Atlantic.

Early and family life
John Luce was born on 4 February 1870 at Halcombe, Malmesbury, in the English county of Wiltshire. In 1902, he married Mary Dorothea Tucker; and they had three children. The eldest, Alfred, born on 6 November 1903, also joined the Navy and was executive officer of  during the pursuit of the German battleship Bismarck. He died in a training exercise on 20 October 1941. Alfred had two daughters. Sir David Luce, born on 23 January 1906, joined the Navy and served as First Sea Lord from 1963 to 1966. Sir William Luce was born the following year and in later life became the Governor of Aden from 1956 to 1960.

His great-granddaughter is comedian and actress Miranda Hart.

Naval career
Luce joined the Royal Navy as a naval cadet in January 1883. He was promoted to lieutenant on 1 January 1892. From 25 January 1900 he was in command of the training brig , based at Portsmouth. He was with this ship when she took part in the fleet review held at Spithead on 16 August 1902 for the coronation of King Edward VII.

In June 1909, Luce was promoted to captain and from October 1910 to January 1912 he was the captain of the battleship .

In November 1914, he took part in the Battle of Coronel in the South Atlantic. During the battle, Glasgow together with the cruisers  and  engaged the German East Asia Cruiser Squadron, including the new cruisers SMS Scharnhorst and SMS Gneisenau. The German light cruisers had only  guns, which had left Glasgow relatively unscathed, but these were now joined by the 8.2-inch guns of Gneisenau. Luce determined that nothing was to be gained by staying and attempting to fight. It was noticed that each time he fired, the flash of his guns was used by the Germans to aim a new salvo, so he also ceased firing. One compartment of the ship was flooded, but she could still manage . He returned first to Monmouth, which was now dark but still afloat. Nothing was to be done for the ship, which was sinking slowly but would attempt to beach on the Chilean coast. Glasgow turned south and departed. Having inflicted little damage on the enemy, Glasgow escaped with moderate damage considering that an estimated 600 shells were fired at her, although the other British cruisers were lost with all hands.

The following month, Luce, still commanding Glasgow, took part in the Battle of the Falkland Islands. During the battle Glasgow and the armored cruiser  had chased down the German light cruiser SMS Leipzig; Glasgow closed to finish Leipzig which had run out of ammunition but was still flying her battle ensign. Leipzig fired two flares, so Glasgow ceased fire. At 21:23, more than 80 mi (70 nmi; 130 km) southeast of the Falklands, Leipzig rolled over, leaving only 18 survivors. On 15 March 1915, Luce cornered SMS Dresden, which was scuttled at the end of the Battle of Más a Tierra in neutral waters.

In 1917, Luce was appointed Commodore of the Royal Naval Air Service's Central Depot and Training Establishment at Cranwell. However, the following year when Cranwell became part of the newly founded Royal Air Force (RAF), Luce was replaced by Brigadier General Harold Douglas Briggs who had transferred from the Navy to the RAF.

Towards the close of 1921, Luce was appointed Admiral Superintendent, Malta Dockyard.

Later life
After he had retired from the Navy, Luce served as High Sheriff of Wiltshire from 1930 to 1931. He was promoted admiral on the Retired List on 1 April 1930.

Luce died on 22 September 1932 at Little Cheverell House, Wiltshire. There is a memorial to him in Malmesbury Abbey.

Notes

External links
Royal Navy Flag Officers 1904–1945 – Rear-Admiral John Luce C.B. 

|-

|-

|-

|-

|-

|-

1870 births
1932 deaths
Military personnel from Wiltshire
Companions of the Order of the Bath
Royal Navy rear admirals
Royal Navy officers of World War I